2017 is the first year in the history of Legacy Fighting Alliance, a mixed martial arts promotion based in the United States.

Event list

Legacy Fighting Alliance 1: Peterson vs. Higo

Legacy Fighting Alliance 1: Peterson vs. Higo was the inaugural event of Legacy Fighting Alliance and took place on January 13, 2017 after the merger of Legacy Fighting Championship and Resurrection Fighting Alliance. It aired on AXS TV.

Results

Legacy Fighting Alliance 2: Richman vs. Stojadinovic

Legacy Fighting Alliance 2: Richman vs. Stojadinovic was the second event of Legacy Fighting Alliance and took place on January 20, 2017. It aired on AXS TV.
 
Results

Legacy Fighting Alliance 3: Spann vs. Giles

Legacy Fighting Alliance 3: Spann vs. Giles was the third event of Legacy Fighting Alliance and took place on February 10, 2017. It aired on AXS TV.
 
Results

Legacy Fighting Alliance 4: Aguilar vs. Jackson

Legacy Fighting Alliance 4: Aguilar vs. Jackson was the fourth event of Legacy Fighting Alliance and took place on February 17, 2017. It aired on AXS TV.
 
Results

Legacy Fighting Alliance 5: Edwards vs. Townsend

Legacy Fighting Alliance 5: Edwards vs. Townsend was the fifth event of Legacy Fighting Alliance and took place on February 24, 2017. It aired on AXS TV.
 
Results

Legacy Fighting Alliance 6: Junior vs. Rodriguez

Legacy Fighting Alliance 6: Junior vs. Rodriguez was the sixth event of Legacy Fighting Alliance and took place on March 10, 2017. It aired on AXS TV.
 
Results

Legacy Fighting Alliance 7: Sanchez vs. Mai

Legacy Fighting Alliance 7: Sanchez vs. Mai was the seventh event of Legacy Fighting Alliance and took place on March 24, 2017. It aired on AXS TV.
 
Results

Legacy Fighting Alliance 8: Hamilton vs. Bazzi

Legacy Fighting Alliance 8: Hamilton vs. Bazzi was the eighth event of Legacy Fighting Alliance and took place on April 7, 2017 at the TD Convention Center. It aired on AXS TV.
 
Results

Legacy Fighting Alliance 9: Dennis vs. Marques

Legacy Fighting Alliance 9: Dennis vs. Marques was the ninth event of Legacy Fighting Alliance and took place on April 14, 2017. It aired on AXS TV.
 
Results

Legacy Fighting Alliance 10: Heinisch vs. Rota

Legacy Fighting Alliance 10: Heinisch vs. Rota was the tenth event of Legacy Fighting Alliance and took place on April 21, 2017. It aired on AXS TV.
 
Results

Legacy Fighting Alliance Fight Night 1: Sioux Falls

Legacy Fighting Alliance Fight Night 1: Sioux Falls was the eleventh event of Legacy Fighting Alliance and took place on April 29, 2017. It aired on AXS TV.
 
Results

Legacy Fighting Alliance 11: Frincu vs. Mendonça

Legacy Fighting Alliance 11: Frincu vs. Mendonça was the twelfth event of Legacy Fighting Alliance and took place on May 5, 2017. It aired on AXS TV.
 
Results

Legacy Fighting Alliance 12: Krantz vs. Neumann

Legacy Fighting Alliance 12: Krantz vs. Neumann was the thirteenth event of Legacy Fighting Alliance and took place on May 19, 2017. It aired on AXS TV.
 
Results

Legacy Fighting Alliance 13: Millender vs. Holland

Legacy Fighting Alliance 13: Millender vs. Holland was the fourteenth event of Legacy Fighting Alliance and took place on June 2, 2017. It aired on AXS TV.
 
Results

Legacy Fighting Alliance 14: Allen vs. Anders

Legacy Fighting Alliance 14: Allen vs. Anders was the fifteenth event of Legacy Fighting Alliance and took place on June 23, 2017. It aired on AXS TV.
 
Results

Legacy Fighting Alliance 15: Odoms vs. Vanderaa

Legacy Fighting Alliance 15: Odoms vs. Vanderaa was the sixteenth event of Legacy Fighting Alliance and took place on June 30, 2017. It aired on AXS TV.
 
Results

Legacy Fighting Alliance 16: Bedford vs. Flick

Legacy Fighting Alliance 16: Bedford vs. Flick was the seventeenth event of Legacy Fighting Alliance and took place on July 14, 2017. It aired on AXS TV.
 
Results

Legacy Fighting Alliance 17: Moisés vs. Watley

Legacy Fighting Alliance 17: Moisés vs. Watley was the eighteenth event of Legacy Fighting Alliance and took place on July 21, 2017. It aired on AXS TV.
 
Results

Legacy Fighting Alliance 18: Aguilar vs. Rader

Legacy Fighting Alliance 18: Aguilar vs. Rader was the nineteenth event of Legacy Fighting Alliance and took place on August 4, 2017. It aired on AXS TV.
 
Results

Legacy Fighting Alliance 19: Michaud vs. Rodrigues

Legacy Fighting Alliance 19: Michaud vs. Rodrigues was the twentieth event of Legacy Fighting Alliance and took place on August 18, 2017. It aired on AXS TV.
 
Results

Legacy Fighting Alliance 20: Curry vs. Barnes

Legacy Fighting Alliance 20: Curry vs. Barnes was the twenty-first event of Legacy Fighting Alliance and took place on August 25, 2017. It aired on AXS TV.
 
Results

Legacy Fighting Alliance 21: Noblitt vs. Branjão

Legacy Fighting Alliance 21: Noblitt vs. Branjão was the twenty-second event of Legacy Fighting Alliance and took place on September 1, 2017. It aired on AXS TV.
 
Results

Legacy Fighting Alliance 22: Heinisch vs. Perez

Legacy Fighting Alliance 22: Heinisch vs. Perez was the twenty-third event of Legacy Fighting Alliance and took place on September 8, 2017. It aired on AXS TV.
 
Results

Legacy Fighting Alliance 23: Krantz vs. Nakashima

Legacy Fighting Alliance 23: Krantz vs. Nakashima was the twenty-fourth event of Legacy Fighting Alliance and took place on September 22, 2017. It aired on AXS TV.
 
Results

Legacy Fighting Alliance 24: Frincu vs. Millender

Legacy Fighting Alliance 24: Frincu vs. Millender was the twenty-fifth event of Legacy Fighting Alliance and took place on October 13, 2017. It aired on AXS TV.
 
Results

Legacy Fighting Alliance 25: Cochrane vs. Rodrigues

Legacy Fighting Alliance 25: Cochrane vs. Rodrigues was the twenty-sixth event of Legacy Fighting Alliance and took place on October 20, 2017. It aired on AXS TV.
 
Results

Legacy Fighting Alliance 26: Odoms vs. Hughes

Legacy Fighting Alliance 26: Odoms vs. Hughes was the twenty-seventh event of Legacy Fighting Alliance and took place on November 3, 2017. It aired on AXS TV.
 
Results

Legacy Fighting Alliance 27: Watley vs. Wilson

Legacy Fighting Alliance 27: Watley vs. Wilson was the twenty-eighth event of Legacy Fighting Alliance and took place on November 10, 2017. It aired on AXS TV.
 
Results

Legacy Fighting Alliance 28: Jackson vs. Luna

Legacy Fighting Alliance 28: Jackson vs. Luna was the twenty-ninth event of Legacy Fighting Alliance and took place on December 8, 2017. It aired on AXS TV.
 
Results

Legacy Fighting Alliance 29: Camus vs. Simón

Legacy Fighting Alliance 29: Camus vs. Simón was the thirtieth event of Legacy Fighting Alliance and took on December 15, 2017. It aired on AXS TV.
 
Results

References

External links
http://www.lfafighting.com

Legacy Fighting Alliance
2017 in mixed martial arts